Michael Rhodes (born December 4, 1989) is an American professional mixed martial artist currently competing in the Middleweight division. A professional competitor since 2012, Rhodes has formerly competed for the UFC, Bellator MMA, Absolute Championship Berkut, and RFA.

Background
Rhodes was born and raised in Waterloo, Iowa. He was a troubled youth who often got into fights and had anger management issues. He competed in basketball and football during high school at Waterloo East High School and Columbus Catholic High School in his senior year. He was talented, later continuing his basketball career in college at Ellsworth Community College. During college, Rhodes began training in cardio kickboxing in order to lose weight, losing 110 lbs before transitioning into a career in mixed martial arts.

Mixed martial arts career

Early career
Rhodes compiled an amateur MMA record of 6-2 and was the Iowa Challenge Amateur Middleweight Champion before making his professional debut in 2012. Rhodes then went 6-1 as a professional and won the RFA Welterweight Championship, before being signed by the UFC.  Rhodes signed with the UFC in the winter of 2013.

Ultimate Fighting Championship
Rhodes made his promotional debut against fellow newcomer George Sullivan on January 25, 2014 at UFC on Fox 10.  Sullivan won the fight via unanimous decision.

Rhodes next faced Robert Whittaker on June 28, 2014 at UFC Fight Night 43. Rhodes lost the fight via unanimous decision.

Rhodes was next scheduled to face Paulo Thiago on September 13, 2014 at UFC Fight Night 51.  However, Rhodes pulled out of the fight citing an injury.

Rhodes made his next appearance against Erick Silva on December 20, 2015 at UFC Fight Night 58 on December 20, 2014. Rhodes was defeated via technical submission due to an arm-triangle choke in the first round and was subsequently released from the promotion.

Post-UFC
After being released from the UFC, Rhodes returned to the regional circuit and faced Tom Angeloff at NAFC: Explosion on April 11, 2015. He won via knockout in the first round.

Bellator MMA
On February 28, it was announced that Rhodes would replace Chris Honeycutt in a bout against Kendall Grove at Bellator 174 on March 3, 2017. However, Rhodes was unable to make the required weight, and the bout scratched after they were unable to come to an agreement for the bout to proceed at a catchweight.

Rhodes next faced Rafael Lovato Jr. at Bellator 181 on July 14, 2017. He lost the fight via submission in the first round.

On February 20, 2018 it was announced that Bellator had released Rhodes from the promotion.

Championships and accomplishments
 Resurrection Fighting Alliance
 RFA Welterweight Champion (One time)
Victory Fighting Championship
 VFC Middleweight Champion (Current)
Cage Fury Fighting Championships
CFFC Light Heavyweight Championship (One time)

Mixed martial arts record

|-
|Win
|align=center|12–6
|Christian Torres
|Decision (unanimous)
|LFA 68
|
|align=center|3
|align=center|5:00
|Prior Lake, Minnesota, United States
||
|-
| Win
| align=center| 11–6
| BJ Lacy
| Submission (ankle lock)
| Ascendancy FC 18
| 
| align=center| 1
| align=center| 2:00
| Waterloo, Iowa, United States
|
|- 
| Loss
| align=center|10–6
| Ibragim Chuzhigaev
| Decision (unanimous)
| ACB 87: Mousah vs. Whiteford
| 
| align=center| 3
| align=center| 5:00
| Nottingham, England 
|
|-
| NC
| align=center|10–5 (1)
| Bryan Baker
| NC (elbows to back of head)
| Extreme Beatdown: Beatdown 21
| 
| align=center| 2
| align=center| 3:18
| New Town, North Dakota, United States 
|
|-
| Loss
| align=center|10–5
| Rafael Lovato Jr.
| Submission (rear-naked choke)
| Bellator 181
| 
| align=center| 1
| align=center| 1:59
| Thackerville, Oklahoma, United States 
|
|-
| Win
| align=center|10–4
| Rakim Cleveland
| Submission (guillotine choke)
| VFC 51: Emerson vs. West
| 
| align=center| 2
| align=center| 2:42
| Urbandale, Iowa, United States 
|
|-
| Win
| align=center| 9–4
| Mark Stoddard
| Decision (unanimous)
| NAFC: Super Brawl
| 
| align=center| 3
| align=center| 5:00
| Waukesha, Wisconsin, United States
|
|-
| Win
| align=center| 8–4
| Taki Uluilakepa
| Submission (rear-naked choke)
| Prestige FC 1: Atonement
| 
| align=center| 3
| align=center| 3:54
| Weyburn, Saskatchewan, Canada
|Catchweight (175 lbs) bout.
|-
| Win
| align=center| 7–4
| Tom Angeloff
| KO (punch)
| NAFC: Explosion
| 
| align=center| 1
| align=center| 1:36
| Waukesha, Wisconsin, United States
| 
|-
| Loss
| align=center| 6–4
| Erick Silva
| Submission (arm-triangle choke)
| UFC Fight Night: Machida vs. Dollaway
| 
| align=center| 1
| align=center| 1:15
| Barueri, Brazil
| 
|-
| Loss
| align=center| 6–3
| Robert Whittaker
| Decision (unanimous)
| UFC Fight Night: Te-Huna vs. Marquardt
| 
| align=center| 3
| align=center| 5:00
| Auckland, New Zealand
| 
|-
| Loss
| align=center| 6–2
| George Sullivan
| Decision (unanimous)
| UFC on Fox: Henderson vs. Thomson
| 
| align=center| 3
| align=center| 5:00
| Chicago, Illinois, United States
| 
|-
| Win
| align=center| 6–1
| Alan Jouban
| Decision (unanimous)
| RFA 10: Rhodes vs. Jouban
| 
| align=center| 5
| align=center| 5:00
| Des Moines, Iowa, United States
|
|-
| Win
| align=center| 5–1
| Benjamin Smith
| TKO (punches)
| RFA 8: Pettis vs. Pegg
| 
| align=center| 1
| align=center| 0:56
| Milwaukee, Wisconsin, United States
| 
|-
| Loss
| align=center| 4–1
| Brandon Thatch
| Submission (rear-naked choke)
| RFA 7: Thatch vs. Rhodes
| 
| align=center| 1
| align=center| 2:22
| Broomfield, Colorado, United States
| 
|-
| Win
| align=center| 4–0
| Quartus Stitt
| TKO (retirement)
| Madtown Throwdown 29: Unstoppable
| 
| align=center| 2
| align=center| 5:00
| Madison, Wisconsin, United States
| 
|-
| Win
| align=center| 3–0
| Matt Gauthier
| Submission (armbar)
| RWC: Rogue Warrior Championships 3
| 
| align=center| 1
| align=center| 4:04
| Green Bay, Wisconsin, United States
|
|-
| Win
| align=center| 2–0
| Torrey Berendes
| KO (punch)
| Madtown Throwdown 28: Hells Bells
| 
| align=center| 1
| align=center| 0:42
| Madison, Wisconsin, United States
|
|-
| Win
| align=center| 1–0
| Zak Ottow
| Decision (unanimous)
| NAFC: Colosseum
| 
| align=center| 3
| align=center| 5:00
| Milwaukee, Wisconsin, United States
|

References

External links
 
 

American practitioners of Brazilian jiu-jitsu
American male mixed martial artists
Mixed martial artists from Iowa
African-American mixed martial artists
Welterweight mixed martial artists
Mixed martial artists utilizing Brazilian jiu-jitsu
Living people
People from Iowa
1989 births
Ultimate Fighting Championship male fighters
21st-century African-American sportspeople
20th-century African-American people